Great Britain  competed at the 1973 World Aquatics Championships in Belgrade, Yugoslavia from August 31 to September 9.

Diving

References

World Aquatics Championships
1973
Nations at the 1973 World Aquatics Championships